Mårten Olander (born 5 November 1971) is a Swedish professional golfer.

Olander attended the University of Alabama for four years, and was awarded the Ben Hogan Award for the best college golfer in the United States in 1993.

He turned professional in 1995, and joined the Challenge Tour in 1996, winning promotion to the European Tour in his debut season. He returned to the Challenge Tour for 1999, and spent three further seasons there before winning his first professional tournament at the 2001 Hardelot Challenge de France, sealing his return to the full European Tour. He spent a further five seasons at the highest level, before a dramatic slump in form saw him make only three cuts in 2006, since when he has played rarely.

Olander's best result on the European Tour was a four-way tie for second at the 2003 Telefonica Open de Madrid. 2003 was also his most successful season, as he ended 61st on the Order of Merit.

In 2008, Olander was joint captain of the successful European Palmer Cup team.

Professional wins (2)

Challenge Tour wins (1)

Swedish Golf Tour wins (1)

Results in major championships

Note: Olander only played in The Open Championship.
CUT = missed the half-way cut
"T" = tied

Team appearances
Amateur
European Amateur Team Championship (representing Sweden): 1993

See also
Alabama Crimson Tide golf

References

External links

Swedish male golfers
Alabama Crimson Tide men's golfers
European Tour golfers
Sportspeople from Uppsala
People from Kalmar
1971 births
Living people
20th-century Swedish people
21st-century Swedish people